Jason John Russo (born November 20, 1973) is an American heavy metal singer, songwriter and session recording vocalist, best known for having fronted Buffalo, New York heavy metal band Herod (signed by Lifeforce Records). Jason is classically and operatically trained with a powerful 3½ octave vocal range.

Discography
 Metal Force Metal Rebirth - 2010
 Worwyk Malignant - 2009
 Darkling Metal Reborn - 2007
 Herod Rich Man's War, Poor Man's Fight - 2006
 Darkling Sinking - 2004

Other interests
 In July 2010, Russo fronted Icarus Witch for the first 3 shows on their tour with Y&T.
 In March 2010, Russo did a video and musical remake of A-ha’s song "Take On Me".
 Russo had an acting role in Killer Wolf Films "Fist of the Vampire" (imdb.com)

References

External links
 LIFEFORCERECORDS.com 
 Official website
 Darkling

American heavy metal singers
Living people
1973 births
People from Jacksonville, North Carolina
21st-century American singers